Aarau District is a district in the Swiss Canton of Aargau with administrative capital Aarau encompasses the agglomeration of Aarau south of the Juras.

Geography

Demographics

In 2000, there were 3,277 homes with 1 or 2 persons in the household, 14,181 homes with 3 or 4 persons in the household, and 9,295 homes with 5 or more persons in the household.  The average number of people per household was 2.24 individuals. In 2008, there were 10,614 single family homes (or 32.3% of the total) out of a total of 32,851 homes and apartments.

Of the school age population, there were 4,891 students attending primary school, 1,755 students attending secondary school, 1,175 students attending tertiary or university level schooling and 35 students who are seeking a job after school in the municipality.

Economy
In 2000, there were 32,987 residents who worked in the district, while 23,730 residents worked outside the Aarau District and 29,444 people commuted into the district for work.

Religion
From the 2000 census, 17,246 or 27.3% were Roman Catholic, while 31,124 or 49.3% belonged to the Swiss Reformed Church. Of the rest of the population, there are 179 individuals (or about 0.28% of the population) who belong to the Christian Catholic faith.

Municipalities
<div style="padding:1em 20px 1em 20px; color:#000000;text-align:left;">

 In 2010, Rohr merged into Aarau, Aarau area includes Rohr

Mergers
The following changes to the district's municipalities have occurred since 2000:
2010: Rohr merged into Aarau

References

Districts of Aargau